Benfield Group was a leading independent reinsurance and risk intermediary. Customers included most of the world's major insurance and reinsurance companies as well as government entities and global corporations. A former constituent of the FTSE 250 Index, the company has been a division of Aon Corporation since November 2008.

History 
The company was established as a Lloyd's broker in 1973 as Benfield, Lovick, and Rees & Company (BLR). In 1988, a management buyout led to the formation of Benfield Group.

In the 1990s and early 2000s, the company grew through a series of mergers with Ellinger Heath Western, Greig Fester, and E.W. Blanch. The company was first listed on the London Stock Exchange in 2003.

On 22 August 2008, Chicago-based Aon Corporation announced that it had agreed to acquire Benfield Group. The $1.43 billion deal was completed on 28 November 2008. Aon's reinsurance broking business continues to operate under the name Aon Benfield.

Operations
Benfield Group was based in London and incorporated in Bermuda. It had an international network of more than 50 offices in the US, UK, Continental Europe, Bermuda and Asia.

Benfield was a reinsurance broker, acting as an intermediary between reinsurance companies and reinsurance purchasers. More than 90% of its revenues came from its reinsurance brokerage business.

Through its subsidiary, Benfield Corporate Risk, Benfield also operated in the primary insurance brokerage space, catering to the complex risk management and transfer needs of corporate entities in selected industries.

References

Insurance companies of the United Kingdom
Companies formerly listed on the London Stock Exchange
Financial services companies established in 1973
1973 establishments in England